The TSHD Sospan Dau is a Dutch trailing suction hopper dredger owned by Sosban BV. The vessel has worked on dredging projects, including offshore aggregates, port maintenance, land reclamation, coastal defense and beach replenishment. The name Sospan Dau is Welsh and originates from Sosban Fach and Llanelli's tin plating industry, Sospan being the Welsh for Saucepan and Dau being Welsh for Two as the ship is a successor to the original Sospan.

Equipment 
The ship has a traditional twin propeller stern and bow thruster for manoeuvering and like most trailing dredgers, includes bottom doors for dumping, a dredge engine, a jet water engine, a degassing installation, a suction pipe and associated pipelines and valves. Unique to most dredgers however, is a very large bulbous bow and spud pole for more efficient use of the dredge pump and heading/position keeping during beaching.

Projects 
In 2014 & 2015 the Sospan Dau created the Cowes Harbour breakwater.

References

External links
 http://www.dredgingtoday.com/2013/04/18/video-dredger-sospan-dau-at-work-uk/

Dredgers
Service vessels of the United Kingdom
Papendrecht